Victoria Gunvalson (née Steinmetz; formerly Wolfsmith) is an American reality television personality and businesswoman best known for a starring role as a housewife in the Bravo reality television series The Real Housewives of Orange County for fourteen seasons. She is the founder of Coto Insurance.

Career
She is one of the original cast members of Bravo's reality television show The Real Housewives of Orange County. In January 2020, Gunvalson was fired from the franchise.

In 2020, she hosted a podcast titled Whoop It Up with Vicki. Gunvalson is a successful insurance agent in Coto de Caza, California.

Personal life
Gunvalson is one of five children. Her father owned a construction company and her mother was a housewife. She married her first husband Michael J. Wolfsmith at the age of 21 and they had two children, Michael Wolfsmith (b. 1986) and Briana Culberson (née Wolfsmith, b. 1987). At the age of 29, they divorced and she began a part-time job at her father's construction company.

In 1991, after her father's death from Alzheimer's disease, she joined the health insurance business.
In 1994, she married Donn Gunvalson and founded Coto Insurance and Financial Services, after obtaining her insurance license in California. Vicki and Donn divorced in 2014. Vicki was engaged to Steve Lodge, brother of Roger Lodge, from April 2019 until September of 2021.

During the tenth season of The Real Housewives of Orange County, Gunvalson dated Brooks Ayers. It was revealed that Ayers' claim that he had cancer, which was a story line throughout the season, was untrue, and that Gunvalson lied about it. In 2015, Ayers admitted that he had fabricated "documents to 'prove' to the world that I, in fact, have cancer."

In November 2021, Gunvalson revealed she had recently battled cancer.

Filmography

References

External links

 
 

1962 births
American businesspeople in insurance
Businesspeople from California
California Republicans
Living people
People from Cook County, Illinois
The Real Housewives cast members